Moggina Manasu is a 2008 Indian Kannada-language romantic drama film directed by Shashank and produced by E. Krishnappa under the banner E. K. Entertainers. It stars Radhika Pandit and Shuba Punja in lead roles. The supporting cast features Yash, Jadi Akash, Skanda, Manoj, Sangeetha Shetty, Manasi and Harsha.

The film was a critical and a commercial success at the box-office having received appreciation from critics and audience alike. The film also completed a 100-day run at a theatre in Bangalore. The film was remade in Telugu as Lokame Kothaga.

Plot
 
The plot revolves around the concepts of love, friendship and its impact on life. It follows the journey of the female lead, Chanchala and her experiences once she pursues further studies in a college. 
The opening scene shows Chanchala seated in a train, reading a letter from her college friend, Deeksha about attending the college reunion function. She observes the exchange between a teenager daughter and mother about first day at college. This takes her back to remembering her first day, where her parents are supportive and tell her to stay focused about studies. Upon entering college, she is stopped by two senior girls who tease her to do a task as told by them. She does the task but ends up crying, while one of them offers her to be friends with them in consolation. These two senior girls go on to become her mentors and best friends in the movie, whom she calls as Akka/Deeksha and Didi. The movie shifts its view to another girl, Renuka Devi a small-town girl whose father drops her off to her first class where Chanchala is. Chanchala befriends her and hears that Renuka comes from a far away village and wants to study in this college to become a doctor in the future. When asked why doctor, Renu shares that she lost her mother at a young age as there was no doctor nearby and so she wants to become one and save lives in rural areas. Their first class is held by an English male teacher, Ramesh who later plays a big role in influencing Chanchala. Over time, Chanchala and Renu spend a lot of time with Didi and Akka who tell them about the perks of having a boyfriend and how to dress up to woo boys. Chanchala and Renu undergo a major makeover, leaving an impression wherever they go. Chanchala ends up getting dropped by her teacher, Ramesh when she is caught in heavy rains, and here she starts to have feelings towards him. On teachers day, she decides to confess her love to him but before she can do so, she finds another student doing the same. She overhears Ramesh explain to the student that it is not love, but mere infatuation that the student feels towards him. He also encourages the student to love him as a teacher and perform well in studies. On hearing this, Chanchala realises her feelings were wrong and changes her mind about revealing anything to the teacher. In the meantime, Renu has been enjoying with the two seniors and meets Akash through their boyfriends. She falls in love with him and wants to make him her boyfriend. She manages to gain his attention and enjoys his company, while Chanchala feels left out for not having a boyfriend. She is constantly followed by a boy who claims he loves her a lot. She initially denies any interest in him but then is persuaded when he tries to take his own life in front of her. She later agrees and he becomes part of her group of friends. As time goes by, the boy constantly tells Chanchala what to do and not to do, while she follows all his requests. He finally tells her not to hang out with Akka, Didi and Renu as they are not nice girls. He tells her she has to choose between him and them, she says she cannot choose as both are equally important. He walks away, breaking Chanchala's heart. She ends up being unwell and taken care by her parents during this time and realises she doesn't need a boy like him and tells him to forget her. 
Deeksha, tired of her father's constant controlling behaviour walks out of the house, while her mother requests her to stay. 
Renu has been spending a lot of time with Akash, though Chanchala tells her that she is moving too fast with him and needs to slow down and focus on studies. At the same moment, Renu's father visits them and says he has sold their land so that he can finance Renu's education and needed her to sign the papers. Renu signs and right after meets Akash and spends time with him at a resort, partying. The movie shows the positive side of Deeksha and her boyfriend's relationship with Chanchal admiring him for leaving his studies to help support Deeksha's dream of pursuing Basketball. Chanchala while spending time at the beach, hears a child playing a beautiful tune on handmade violin, selling them to finance her education. Chanchala is touched and ends up buying as many as she can from the child with her entire pocket money. This is captured in photos by Rahul. Chanchala gets to meet Rahul, who apologises to her for taking her pictures without her permission and invites her to an event. At the event, which is Rahul's parent's 25th anniversary, it is seen that his family have sponsored the same child that Chanchala bought the wooden violin toys from. Rahul drops Chanchala off and asks her out. She doesn't respond and thanks him for letting her attend the event. Rahul and Chanchala spend quality time with each other where he runs his upcoming album's songs to her. Deeksha's mother passes away and she tries to attend the funeral but her father doesn't let her and slaps her boyfriend in front of everyone. Deeksha goes into depression and their relationship ends due to a lot of arguments. 
In next scenes, Renu is seen talking to Akash, where she mentions to him that she is pregnant and would like to get married. Akash laughs it off, saying that is it not practical or the age to be getting married. He asks her to abort the child to which she disagrees. She later is found sharing this information with Chanchala and Akka. Both of them end up scolding her for her actions, with Akka telling her to get an abortion rather than be fixated about having the child. Renu wonders aloud how can she who wants to save lives in the future kill one now? Akka tells her Akash will not agree to be a part of her life and that all men are the same who use women and throw them away, giving the example of her sister. Hearing this, Chanchala has a chat with Rahul about life and love, he professes his love for her and that he would never let go of her. At that moment, Chanchala receives a call and she rushes to the college hostel to find out that Renu has committed suicide. 
Chanchala mourns for Renu and assumes all men are the same, she makes the decision to let go of Rahul. She meets him at their favourite spot and breaks up with him without any explanation. 
In present day, Chanchala is picked up by Deeksha from the train station and taken home where she meets Deeksha's daughter, father and boyfriend (now husband). Chanchala is thrilled to see that everything is sorted for Deeksha. They both head to the college reunion where they meet Akka who is also married happily. Chanchala is happy to see them all settled and the three remember Renu. The event is about to start but Chanchala notices her teacher, Ramesh and heads out to meet him. She overhears the music and realises it is Rahul singing one of the songs he had back in the day to her. She runs to the auditorium where the event is happening and sees Rahul on stage. She rushes to hug him but he doesn't hug her back, telling her that her memories only remain in his songs and not his heart. She is heartbroken and walks away. He continues to sing while she cries her heart out in a separate scene, she cleans up and comes back to watch the show. Rahul, declares that he has found his one true love again and would like to propose to her with the blessings of the audience. While the audience cheers on, Rahul ends up next to Chanchala and asking if she would love him as much as he has all these years. Both their parents are present in the audience and give their approval, saying that young love always is the true one.

Cast

 Radhika Pandit as Chanchala
 Shubha Poonja as Renuka Devi
 Yash as Rahul
 Sangeetha Shetty as Sanjana
 Manasi as Deeksha
 Rajesh Nataranga
 Sudha Belawadi
 Jadi Akash
 Skanda
 Sneha Acharya (cameo)
 Manoj
 Harsha
Achyuth Kumar
 Jai Jagadish
 Avinash
 Akash Bellary

Soundtrack

Mano Murthy composed the music for the film and the soundtracks. The album consists of eleven soundtracks.

Critical reception
Upon its theatrical release, Moggina Manasu received generally positive response from critics. Sify.com gave the film a rating of three out of five and praised the roles of music, cinematography and the acting departments in the film writing, "The spectacular cinematography and music for this film is good. Each and every frame is taken with utmost care and all the songs are tolerable and soothing to the ears. A new promising heroine Radhika Pandit is the surprise element who is extraordinary in her first film." and further added writing, "Shubha Punja has also done a neat job and the other two girls Sangeetha Shetty and Manasi also fit the bill perfectly. Among the boys, it is Yash who stands out, though the performances of Skanda, Harsha and Manoj is good." R. G. Vijayasarathy of Rediff too gave the film a 3/5 rating and wrote, "Great performances from the new talents, superior technical work by cameraman, great work by Chandrashekhar and good editing by Suresh Urs, enhance the film." However, he called for "more attention should have been paid to the screenplay."

Awards

References

External links 
 
 Official website of Moggina Manasu

2008 films
2000s Kannada-language films
Indian romantic musical films
Indian female buddy films
Films directed by Shashank
Films scored by Mano Murthy
Kannada films remade in other languages
Indian coming-of-age films
Teenage pregnancy in film